The Pearl River is a river in the U.S. states of Mississippi and Louisiana. The lower part of the river forms part of the boundary between Mississippi and Louisiana.

The river watershed contains large areas of bottomland hardwood swamp and cypress swamp, providing habitat for many species of wildlife, including sturgeon and black bears. As recently as 2008, endangered ivory-billed woodpeckers were reportedly sighted here. The mouth of the river creates important marsh habitat along salinity gradients, which has been the subject of many scientific studies. It is considered to be one of the most critical areas of natural habitat remaining in Louisiana.

Mississippi's capital and largest city, Jackson, is located along the upper reaches of the river. Most of the towns along the river, starting with Philadelphia, Mississippi in the north, are within the boundaries of that state.

Tributaries and hydrology

The Yockanookany and Strong rivers are tributaries on the upper section of the river north of Jackson: the Lobutcha, Tuscolameta, and Pelahatchie creeks also feed in as tributaries in this region. In 1924 the Tuscolameta Creek received  24-mile channelization and Yockanookany River received a 36-mile canal, which was completed in 1928.

Northeast of Jackson, the Ross Barnett Reservoir was formed by a 1962 dam. Average annual rainfall is about 52 inches in the upper third of the basin, and below Jackson the basin rainfall increases to 64 inches or more, contributing to the greater discharge of the Bogue Chitto as noted below.

The Bogue Chitto River is a major tributary on the lower section. The Bogue Chitto's mean low-water discharge to the lower river is nearly six times that of the mean low-water discharge of the Pearl River at Jackson, Mississippi, according to a 1936 government report of the Mississippi Planning Commission. 

The East Pearl River empties into Lake Borgne, where the dredged Pearl River Channel meets the Gulf Intracoastal Waterway.  The discharge flows eastward past Grand Island through St. Joe Pass and into the Mississippi Sound.  The West Pearl River flows into The Rigolets, thence into Lake Borgne. Both discharges eventually reach the Gulf of Mexico.  The Pearl River serves as the  boundary between Mississippi and Louisiana in its lower reach near the Gulf of Mexico.

Pearl River towns
The following towns (in order, north to south) developed on or near the Pearl River:
 Philadelphia, Mississippi
 Pearl River, Mississippi - named after the river.
 Carthage, Mississippi
 Jackson, Mississippi
 Flowood, Mississippi
 Pearl, Mississippi - named after the river.
 Georgetown, Mississippi
 Rockport, Mississippi
 Monticello, Mississippi
 Columbia, Mississippi
 Bogalusa, Louisiana
 Picayune, Mississippi
 Pearlington, Mississippi - named after the river.
 Pearl River, Louisiana - named after the river.

Pearl River navigation 
The lower river was navigable from Brashear's Stand on the Natchez Trace to the mouth.  For the year 1827 the enrolled and licensed tonnage for Pearl River shipping was 750 tons. The customhouse at Pearl River which was ten miles inland at the small town of Pearlington, Mississippi was later changed, but in 1904 the district reported a total of 358 vessels and 19,869 tons. The U.S. Army Corps of Engineers has undertaken three significant navigation projects in the Pearl River Basin.  In 1880, Congress authorized a  navigation channel on the West Pearl River from Jackson to the Rigolets. That project was discontinued in 1922.  Beginning in 1910, a channel was dredged from the mouth of the East Pearl River into Lake Borgne, a project which is maintained on an irregular basis. In 1935, the West Pearl River Navigation Project was authorized. It provided for a navigation channel from Bogalusa to the mouth of the West Pearl River. The project includes a canal with three locks.  The Corps of Engineers placed the project in "caretaker" status in the 1970s because of a decline in commercial traffic. Maintenance dredging resumed in December 1988. In the 1950s, underwater concrete sills were constructed to help maintain water levels in the navigation channel.  This has prevented Gulf sturgeon and other migratory species from accessing upstream areas.  A rock ramp constructed in 2003 helps fish navigate over one of the sills, but environmental groups propose further work to mitigate the effects of the navigation project.

Building dams, canals, levees and water control structures is known to have highly negative effects on wetlands and the ecological services they provide. Increasingly, these artificial structures are being removed to allow natural river activities to resume. The Pascagoula River is one of the few remaining southern rivers with natural water regimes, and is a potential model for restoring the Pearl River floodplain. At the Bogalusa, Louisiana gauge the river was recorded in 1983 and 1987 as delivering nearly 3.5 million metric tons and 2.5 million metric tons of sediment respectively.

Hurricane effects
Hurricanes are a natural form of disturbance that shapes rivers and watersheds on the Gulf Coast, and has done so for thousands of years. As one recent example, Hurricane Katrina on August 29, 2005, caused further natural changes in the Pearl River.  Bottom sediments and marsh vegetation—including uprooted cypress and oak trees—blocked the mouth of the West Pearl and other parts of the channel.  The Louisiana Department of Wildlife & Fisheries and other agencies removed 27,000 cubic meters (35,000 yd³) of debris. However, the accumulation of this woody debris is a natural part of floodplain ecosystems in general, and wetlands in particular, and provides vital habitat for species including fish and turtles.  Hence, this use of state funds to remove debris was an expenditure on an activity that is known to have negative impacts upon watersheds and wild species.

See also
List of rivers of Louisiana
List of rivers of Mississippi
1979 Easter flood
 South Atlantic-Gulf Water Resource Region

References

Further reading
Keddy, P.A. 2008. Water, Earth, Fire: Louisiana’s Natural Heritage. Xlibris, Philadelphia. 229 p. Figure 6.1. </ref>(Self-published)

External links

 
Heinrich, P. V., 2005, Contrasting Pleistocene and Holocene Fluvial Systems of the Lower Pearl River, Louisiana and Mississippi, USA. Geological Society of America Abstracts with Programs, Vol. 37, No. 2, p. 41.
Heinrich, P. V., 2006, Pleistocene and Holocene Fluvial Systems of the Lower Pearl River, Mississippi and Louisiana, USA. Gulf Coast Association of Geological Societies Transactions. vol. 56, pp. 267–278. (Contains geologic map of Lower Pearl River Valley)
Heinrich, P. V., R. P. McCulloh, and J. Snead, 2007, Bogalusa 30 x 60 minute geologic quadrangle. Louisiana Geological Survey, Baton Rouge, Louisiana.
Heinrich, P. V., R. P. McCulloh, and J. Snead, 2004, Gulfport 30 x 60 minute geologic quadrangle. Louisiana Geological Survey, Baton Rouge, Louisiana.

Rivers of Louisiana
Rivers of Mississippi
Borders of Mississippi
Borders of Louisiana
Rivers of St. Tammany Parish, Louisiana
Bodies of water of Neshoba County, Mississippi
Bodies of water of Leake County, Mississippi
Bodies of water of Hinds County, Mississippi
Bodies of water of Rankin County, Mississippi
Bodies of water of Copiah County, Mississippi
Bodies of water of Lawrence County, Mississippi
Bodies of water of Marion County, Mississippi
Bodies of water of Washington Parish, Louisiana
Bodies of water of Pearl River County, Mississippi
Bodies of water of Hancock County, Mississippi
Drainage basins of the Gulf of Mexico